The Squire Creek Country Club is a private, members-only country club located in Choudrant, Louisiana, five miles northeast of Ruston. Squire Creek features an 18-hole championship golf course designed by Tom Fazio. Squire Creek is the home golf course for the Louisiana Tech Bulldogs golf team.

History and features
The course has been ranked as number one in the state of Louisiana four times, and was ranked as the No. 5 best new course in the United States by Golf Digest. Squire Creek offers a golf training facility, which features dual bays with retractable doors for indoor or outdoor use, motion analysis, and launch monitor. The Squire Creek tennis facility has 6 lighted courts (4 Hydro Courts and 2 Hard Courts). Squire Creek has full service golf and tennis shops. The Squire Creek fitness facility has 2 exercise rooms and offers massage therapy. The Squire Creek Clubhouse features three dining areas: the more formal Main Dining Hall, the casual 19th Hole, and the Fazio Grill. The Squire Creek Lodge features two floors offering a combined total of seven bedrooms. The Squire Creek Pool overlooks the golf course and is served by the Waterside Cafe. The Squire Creek Development offers six residential estates including the Squire Creek Estates, Timberland Estates, Fairway Estates, The Fairways, Fairway Villas, and The Park Homes. Squire Creek Country Club is the title sponsor of the Louisiana Peach Festival in Ruston.

Tournaments
Squire Creek hosted the 2005 Western Athletic Conference Golf Championships.
Southern Junior Amateur Championship 2010, 2018.
U.S. Women's Mid-Amateur 2015.

Notable celebrity guests
George W. Bush - 2011
Terry Bradshaw - 2005, 2006, 2007, 2008, 2009, 2010,2011,2012,2013,2014
Kix Brooks - 2002, 2003, 2004, 2005, 2006, 2007, 2008, 2009, 2010,2011,2012,2013,2014
Steve Centanni - 2007
Ronnie Dunn - 2002
Mike Huckabee - 2008
Bobby Jindal - 2008
Greta Van Susteren - 2006, 2010
Teresa Weatherspoon - 2011
Willie Roaf - 2011
Tim Floyd - 2011
Jim Wooldridge - 2011
Mike McConathy - 2011
Karl Malone - Regularly
Fred Dean
Morgan Freeman - 2012
Bubba Watson - 2013
Duck Dynasty - 2013
Skip Holtz - Regularly

References

External links
SquireCreek.com
LaTechSports.com

College golf clubs and courses in the United States
Golf clubs and courses in Louisiana
Louisiana Tech Bulldogs and Lady Techsters
Sports venues in Ruston, Louisiana
Buildings and structures in Lincoln Parish, Louisiana
Sports venues completed in 2002
2002 establishments in Louisiana